Nordanstig Municipality (Nordanstigs kommun) is a municipality in Gävleborg County, east central Sweden. 
 
The municipal seat is located in Bergsjö.

The municipality was created in 1974 when Bergsjö, Gnarp, Hassela and Harmånger were amalgamated. The name chosen for the new municipality was taken from a corresponding ecclesiastical entity, Nordanstigs kontrakt, which got this name in 1916 on the initiative of Nathan Söderblom, the archbishop of Uppsala.

The current municipal arms was designed in the mid 80's. It depicts: A horse to symbolize the forest and agricultural industry; the net symbolizes fishing and six net mesh to symbolize the six municipal parishes (Hassela, Bergsjö, Ilsbo, Gnarp, Jättendal and Harmånger).

Olympic gold medalist in slalom from 2018 PyongChang, André Myhrer, is born in Bergsjö, Nordanstig municipality.

Localities
 Bergsjö (seat)
 Hassela
 Harmånger
 Gnarp
 Ilsbo
 Jättendal
 Stocka
 Strömsbruk

Islands
 Gran

Economy
The manufacturing industry provides 25% of the employment; service and communications 14%; agriculture, forest and fishing industries 6%; education and research 9%.

Largest private employers were (2004):
Strömsbruksfabriken - 150 employees
Trima AB - 125 employees
Plyfa AB - 80 employees
SMP Parts - 50 employees
Hassela utbildningscenter - 40 employees
Tjärnviks Trä AB - 40 employees

Sister city
Nordanstig has one sister city: Holeby in Denmark.

References

External links 

 Nordanstig - Official site

Municipalities of Gävleborg County